United Nations Security Council Resolution 1709, adopted unanimously on September 22, 2006, after recalling previous resolutions on the situation in Sudan, particularly resolutions 1590 (2005), 1627 (2005), 1653 (2006), 1653 (2006), 1663 (2006), 1679 (2006) and 1706 (2006), the Council extended the mandate of the United Nations Mission in Sudan (UNMIS) for a period until October 8, 2006.

Details
The Council was concerned at restrictions placed upon the UNMIS peacekeeping mission and the effect on its ability to perform its mandate effectively. Furthermore, it expressed concern at the deteriorating humanitarian situation in Darfur, reiterating the need to end all violence and atrocities in the region.

Determining the situation to remain a threat to international peace and security, the Council renewed the mandate of UNMIS until October 8, 2006, with the intention for further renewals if necessary.

See also
 African Union Mission in Sudan
 African Union – United Nations Hybrid Operation in Darfur
 International response to the War in Darfur
 List of United Nations Security Council Resolutions 1701 to 1800 (2006–2008)
 South Sudan
 Timeline of the War in Darfur
 War in Darfur

References

External links
 
Text of the Resolution at undocs.org

 1709
2006 in Sudan
 1709
September 2006 events